Cornelia Linse (born 3 October 1959 in Greifswald) is a German rower and Olympic medalist. She won the silver medal in double sculls with her partner Heidi Westphal in the 1980 Moscow Olympic Games. In October 1986, she was awarded a Patriotic Order of Merit in gold (first class) for her sporting success.

References

External links
 

1959 births
Living people
People from Greifswald
People from Bezirk Rostock
East German female rowers
Sportspeople from Mecklenburg-Western Pomerania
Olympic rowers of East Germany
Rowers at the 1980 Summer Olympics
Olympic silver medalists for East Germany
Olympic medalists in rowing
World Rowing Championships medalists for East Germany
Medalists at the 1980 Summer Olympics
Recipients of the Patriotic Order of Merit in gold